This list of 2023 motorsport champions is a list of national or international motorsport series with championships decided by the points or positions earned by a driver from multiple races where the season was completed during the 2023 calendar year.

Open-wheel racing

Rally

Rally raid

Sports car and GT

Notes

References

Champions
2023